Oksana Lushchevska (*17 February 1982, Talne) is a Ukrainian children's books writer, translator, and poet.

Education 
Lushchevska is a doctoral student at the University of Georgia, studying children's literature. She completed a master's degree in Russian and Comparative Literature and a Graduate Certificate in Children's Literature from the Pennsylvania State University. She received her B.A. in Ukrainian Language and Literature, English Language and Literature and World Literature from the Pavlo Tychyna Uman State Pedagogical University.

Bibliography 

Children's books

About A Whale. Lviv: Old Lion Publishing House, 2014
The Other Home. Lviv: Old Lion Publishing House, 2013
The Caroling Wolf. Kyiv: Bratske, 2013
The Best Friends. Lviv: Old Lion Publishing House, 2012
Salty and Master Chef Tarapata. Kyiv, Grani-T, 2012
Seva and Co. Ternopil, Navchalna Knyha – Bohdan, 2011
Penpals. Lviv: Old Lion Publishing House, 2011
Golden Wheel of a Year. Kyiv: Smoloskyp, 2011
Escape. Kyiv: Grani-T, 2011
Oksana Lushchevska about Christopher Columbus, John Newbery, Charles Darwin, Chaika Dniprova, Pearl S. Buck. Kyiv: Grani-T, 2011
Christmas Stories. Kyiv: Grani-T, 2010
Strange Chimerical Creatures, or Secrets of the Antique Chest. Kyiv: Grani-T, 2009

Awards 

 2012 The Great Hedgehog Award Nominee
 2011 Ukrainian Book of the Year Nominee
 2009 Smoloskyp Literary Foundation Award
 2008 Golden Stroke Ukrainian Children's Literature Contest Award
 2007 Granoslov Award

References 

 Oksana Lushchevska

External links 

 Oksana Lushchevska biography at the Grani-T Publishing House website
 Oksana Lushchevska biography at the Vydavnytstvo Staroho Leva website
 book reviews on the Working Group for Study of Russian Children's Literature and Culture blog

1982 births
Living people
21st-century Ukrainian writers
21st-century Ukrainian women writers
Ukrainian children's writers
Pennsylvania State University alumni
People from Talne